Sociedade Esportiva Nova Andradina was a football club from Nova Andradina, Mato Grosso do Sul, Brazil. They played in the Campeonato Sul-Matogrossense. Their colours were white and black.

Honors
 Campeonato Sul-Matogrossense: 1
 1992

Defunct football clubs in Mato Grosso do Sul
Association football clubs established in 1989
Association football clubs disestablished in 2018
1989 establishments in Brazil
2018 disestablishments in Brazil